A firearms license (also known as a gun license; or licence in British English) is a license or permit issued by a government authority (typically by the police) of a jurisdiction, that allows the licensee to buy, own, possess, or carry a firearm, often subject to a number of conditions or restrictions, especially with regard to storage requirements or the completion of a firearms safety course, as well as background checks, etc. Firearms licenses are not required in all jurisdictions. Additionally, some countries or states may require by law a "permit-to-purchase" in order to buy handguns or firearms. A licence may also be required to buy ammunition.

The permit or license scope varies according to what firearm(s) or activity(s) it allows the holder to legally do with the firearm. Some jurisdictions may require a firearm license to own a firearm, to engage in hunting, target shooting or collecting, or to carry a concealed firearm, or operate a business (such as being a gun dealer or a gunsmith). Some jurisdictions may require separate licenses for rifles, shotguns or handguns.

The requirement to have a firearm license is usually in addition to a requirement for firearm registration. For example, gun laws in Australia require firearms to be registered by serial number to the owner, who holds a firearm licence.

Countries with firearms licensing

Australia
Brazil
Canada
Czech Republic
Denmark
Finland
France (only northern France)
Germany
India
Ireland
Israel
Italy
New Zealand
Norway
Pakistan
Paraguay
Perú
Philippines
Romania
Slovakia
South Africa
Spain
Sweden
United Kingdom
United States of America (for some states and/or municipalities)
Uruguay
Zimbabwe

See also
 European Firearms Pass
 Overview of gun laws by nation

References

Firearm laws